WXTF-LP (97.9 FM, "WTF Radio") is an American low-power broadcast radio station licensed to serve the community of Harrisville, Michigan. The station's broadcast license is held by the Alcona Music Project, Inc..

Programming
The format is described as "Variety." Volunteers provide close to 100% of the programming - mostly music based. WXTF-LP works with the Alcona Community Schools offering guidance and air time for students interested in radio broadcasting.  WXTF-LP provides local news and is The Sunrise Side's only broadcast outlet for Pacifica's "Democracy Now" and Harry Shearer's "Le Show" programs.  In addition to a state-of-the-art air studio, WXTF-LP has a dedicated "Playroom" live performance studio where local musicians are invited to play.

This station received its original construction permit from the Federal Communications Commission on January 15, 2014. The new station was assigned the WXTF-LP call sign by the FCC on January 23, 2014. WXTF-LP received its license to cover from the FCC on May 22, 2014, and was the first of the new LPFM applicants in Michigan to begin licensed broadcasting. The station counts May 27, 2014, as its first official day of broadcasting.

The station is staffed by volunteers and funded by local contributions.

This community radio station is committed to being on air at least 12 hours per day, and sometimes exceeds that.  Generally it broadcasts between 8:00 a.m. and 9:00 p.m.

In 2017 WXTF-LP moved to a new studio location along with its  aerial, which overlooks the entrance to Harrisville Harbor. When this studio became unsuitable in 2021, the station ceased operations for a short time until a new location in downtown Harrisville was acquired in 2022 and operations resumed.

See also
List of community radio stations in the United States

References

External links
WXTF-LP official website

Interview with WXTF staff US-23 Heritage Project

2014 establishments in Michigan
Alcona County, Michigan
Community radio stations in the United States
XTF-LP
Radio stations established in 2014
XTF-LP